Chances Plain is a rural locality in the Western Downs Region, Queensland, Australia.

Road infrastructure
The Chinchilla–Wondai Road runs along the northern boundary, and the Warrego Highway forms the south-western boundary.

References 

Western Downs Region
Localities in Queensland